Hemmathagama is a small town in the district of Kegalle in Sabaragamuwa province of Sri Lanka. Hemmathagama is connected to A1 highway by B279 road.

People

As per the census of 2012, population of the town and surrounding area is 29537. The inhabitants of the town and surrounding areas are Muslims, adhering to Sunni Islam and Sinhalese Buddhists. Both communities are living with harmony since the history begin.

Above mentioned data collected from PDA (Progressive Development Association)

Education

There are two Navodya Schools, namely Al Azhar and Nagaragiri and one Maha Vidyalaya (Devi Balika). Also many primary schools are available in every surrounding villages.99 % of the inhabitants are literate (above 15 years of age).

Climate

Hemmathagama belongs to the Tropical Evergreen region of central Sri Lanka. The altitude of the area varies from 230 to 320 m above sea level. The average annual rainfall lies between 2500 and 4500 ml, and temperature of the region ranges between 22 degrees and 30 degrees Celsius. It receives most of the rain from Southwest Monsoon. The average wind speed has been measured to be approximately 7.2 km/hour, and humidity in the range lies between 57% and 90%. The whole region is mountainous, but the most famous mountain is the Elephant rock in Kotegoda.

Health

The government hospital of Hemmathagama is providing the necessary medical facilities to the public. Also many clinics are available.

Products

Rubber
Rice
Coco
 Cardamom
 Coffee
 Mango
 Banana
 Coir

External links

 Progressive Development Association

References 

Populated places in Kegalle District